Radha Kalyanam was a 1935 Tamil-language film directed by C. K. Sathasivan. It stars S. Rajam and M. R. Santhanalakshmi. The film was a box-office failure.

Cast
S. Rajam as Krishna
M. R. Santhanalakshmi as Radha 
K. S. Devudu Iyer as Sage Narada
C. M. Durai as Lord Vishnu
Srijanaki
B. Saradha
‘Master’ T.V. Krishnamurthi
H. Yegneswara Bhagavathar
‘Comedian’ K.S. Sankara Iyer
M. Lakshmanan
S. Rajamani
K. Shanthadevi
R. Rajam, 
Soundaravalli
K. Lakshmi
Meenambal

References 

1935 films
1930s Tamil-language films
Indian black-and-white films